Hiddenhausen is a municipality in the district of Herford, in North Rhine-Westphalia, Germany. The municipality was formed in 1969 in a reform of Herford (district) by combining the villages of Lippinghausen, Eilshausen, Schweicheln-Bermbeck, Hiddenhausen, Oetinghausen and Sundern.

Geography
Hiddenhausen is situated approximately 6 km north-west of the centre of Herford and 15 km north-east of Bielefeld.

Neighbouring places
 Bünde
 Kirchlengern 
 Löhne
 Herford
 Enger

Division of the town
Hiddenhausen consists of 6 districts:
 Eilshausen (4,909 inhabitants)
 Hiddenhausen (2,755 inhabitants) 
 Lippinghausen (2,892 inhabitants)
 Oetinghausen (4,038 inhabitants)
 Schweicheln-Bermbeck (5,329 inhabitants)
 Sundern (1,578 inhabitants)

Twin towns
  Loitz (Mecklenburg-Western Pomerania, Germany)
  Czechowice-Dziedzice (Poland)
  Kungälv (Sweden)

References

External links
 Official site 

Herford (district)